Grębocin  is a village in the administrative district of Gmina Lubicz, within Toruń County, Kuyavian-Pomeranian Voivodeship, in north-central Poland.

The village has a population of 2 718 (31.12.2016).

References

Villages in Toruń County